Waiting To Be Old is a compilation album released on the Opprobrium label in August 1997. It was intended as a side-piece to Opprobrium magazine.

Track listing
 Musica Transonic – "Damp Squib"
 Bardo Pond – "Chillam Full"
 Kan Mikami / Toshiaki Ishitsuka – "Live at Aketa no Mise"
 Gate – "The Vulture"
 Flaherty/Colbourne Duo – "For Edge"
 Thurston Moore – "April's Shower"
 Richard Youngs – "Oh Father Soil"
 The Dead C – "There is Something to be Gained"
 Alan Licht / NNCK – "Polarity" [excerpt]
 The Shadow Ring – "Prawnography"
 Toho Sara – "Kyojinen"
 Flying Saucer Attack – "Gone"
 Alastair Galbraith – "Ludd"

External links
An interview with Nick Cain of the Opprobrium label and magazine

1997 compilation albums